The Joint Stock Companies Act 1856 (19 & 20 Vict c 47) was an Act of the Parliament of the United Kingdom. It was a consolidating statute, recognised as the founding piece of modern United Kingdom company law legislation.

Overview
Unlike other Acts of Parliament that preceded it, the 1856 Act provided a simple administrative procedure by which any group of seven people could register a limited liability company for themselves. Companies involved in banking and insurance were explicitly excluded from the provisions of the Act.

Debate
The Joint Stock Companies Bill was introduced to Parliament by the then Vice President of the Board of Trade, Robert Lowe. In doing so he proclaimed the right of every citizen to have freedom of contract and with it obtain limited liability for operating a business. Companies had until recently been prohibited, as a result of the Bubble Act and the stock market panics of the early 18th century. There was still a lot of suspicion of companies, but Lowe rejected the idea that a limited company is inherently subject to fraud, and proposed the suffix "Ltd" to make businesses aware of limited liability.

The Third Reading of the Bill took place on 2 June 1856, and passed easily.

See also
Companies Act
Joint Stock Companies Act 1844
Limited Liability Act 1855

Notes

References
W Paterson (ed). "Joint Stock Companies Act". The Practical Statutes of the Session 1856. London. 1856. Pages 61 to 119.
Welsby and Beavan. Chitty's Collection of Statutes. Third Edition. 1865. Volume 1. Title "Companies (Joint Stock). Pages 684 to 717.
Charles Wordsworth. The Joint Stock Companies Act, 1856. Fourth Edition. Shaw and Sons. London. 1856.
Charles Wordsworth. The New Joint Stock Company Law. Shaw and Sons. London. 1859. Pages 1 to 70.
Henry Thring. The Joint Stock Companies Act, 1856. London. 1856.
William George Harrison and George A Cape. The Joint Stock Companies Act, 1856. London. 1856. Bibliography. Catalogue.
Edward W Cox. "The Joint Stock Companies Act, 1856". The New Law and Practice of Joint Stock Companies. Fourth Edition. London. 1857. Pages 1 to 83.

External links
Joint Stock Companies Act 1856 Table B, original text
Joint Stock Companies Act 1856, explanations

1856 in British law
United Kingdom Acts of Parliament 1856
History of corporate law
United Kingdom company law